Maubelo is a village in Kgalagadi District of Botswana. It is located south of the district capital Tshabong and has a primary school. The population was 514 in 2011 census.

References

Kgalagadi District
Villages in Botswana